The Scoop is an outdoor amphitheatre situated on the south side of the River Thames near Tower Bridge in London, located next to City Hall, providing seating for approximately 800 people. Designed by Townshend Landscape Architects, it is a venue used during the summer to show films, musical performances and theatre productions by such companies as The Steam Industry and The Pantaloons. In June 2008, films shown at The Scoop included The Dam Busters, Atonement and Withnail and I. The Scoop has been used as a performance venue since 2002.

References 

the large stainless steel tube,was fabricated by A.Fisher of the stainless steel works.

External links 

The Scoop at More London
The Scoop at Townshend Landscape Architects

Amphitheatres in the United Kingdom
Buildings and structures in the London Borough of Southwark
Music venues in London
Parks and open spaces in the London Borough of Southwark